Deanna Kamiel  (July 6, 1946 – June 14, 2018) was a Canadian-born director, documentary film/public TV writer/producer  with a career in public broadcasting at the CBC in Toronto and PBS in Minneapolis  and professor of film development at SUNY Purchase College and then at The New School, Manhattan, New York City, US. She worked for 26 years (1992–2018) as Head of The New School's Documentary Studies program, Director of Graduate Certificate in Doc Studies Program, and Assistant Professor of Media Studies - School of Media Studies, Manhattan, New York, U.S. Kamiel's documentaries were based on live interviews of the person(s) the film was about.  As a student at The University of Toronto in the 1960s, she wrote for The Varsity in Toronto, and The Ubyssey in Vancouver.

Awards 
 Guggenheim Fellowship, 1984, Creative Arts, video and audio
 Museum of Modern Art  
 Northwest Broadcast News Association (regional Emmy), 1983  
 National Association of Working Women, Best Profile, 1983
 National Film Board of Canada  
 International Public Television Festival (INPUT): 1986, 1985, 1984  
 Tokyo Video Festival, First Prize, Nuclear Outpost, 1985 
 Chicago International Film Festival, Cinematography, Nuclear Outpost, 1985  
 The Humanitarian Award at the Long Island International Film Expo, June 30, 2014
 Emmy (New York), City Arts, WNET, 1999

Grants 
 Ontario Arts Council Grant, 1979
 Faculty Support Award, Purchase College, State University of New York, 2005 
 Faculty Support Award, Purchase College, State University of New York, 2010 
 Provost Faculty Research Fund Grant, The New School, Office of the Provost, 2013-14

Books 
The Lace Ghetto

Filmography 

 Visions of Cinema (Interviews with Joseph L. Mankiewicz, Jonathan Demme, and Jean Luc Godard)
 Visions of Home   
 Jean-Luc Godard
 Boys with bats: an American romance
 Milgrom's Obsession
 Maggie and the Men of Minnesota, 1972
 Dean and Me: Roadshow of an American Primary
 Ruth 
 Adoption 
 Nuclear Outpost 
 Mickey's Diner
 Nuclear Outpost
 Nighttime at the Diner   
 Lessons from an American Primary

Articles 

 "I believe my eyes: The transformative theatre of Hanif Kureishi",

References

External links 

Jewish Canadian writers
20th-century Canadian women writers
21st-century Canadian women writers
Canadian women screenwriters
Canadian documentary film directors
Canadian documentary film producers
Canadian political writers
2018 deaths
Canadian educators
Canadian non-fiction writers
Canadian schoolteachers
Deaths from pancreatic cancer
Feminist filmmakers
1946 births
Canadian women non-fiction writers
Canadian women documentary filmmakers
Jewish Canadian filmmakers
Canadian women film directors
Canadian women film producers